Chung Tin is one of the 41 constituencies in the Sha Tin District in Hong Kong.

The constituency returns one district councillor to the Sha Tin District Council, with an election every four years.

Previously called Chung Shing, the current Chung Tin constituency is loosely based on Mei Chung Court, Peak One, Granville Garden, Heung Fan Liu New Village and part of Mei Tin Estate, with an estimated population of 15,131.

Councillors represented

Election results

2010s

2000s

References

Tai Wai
Constituencies of Hong Kong
Constituencies of Sha Tin District Council
2003 establishments in Hong Kong
Constituencies established in 2003